Handsworth & Smethwick was an intermediate station on the Great Western Railway's London Paddington to Birkenhead via Birmingham Snow Hill line. It was opened in 1854.

The station's architecture was reminiscent of that of other stations and was almost exactly the same as Wednesbury and West Bromwich stations.

The station closed in 1972, with the line and much of the site has been demolished.

Site today
In 1999, Handsworth Booth Street tram stop was opened on the site of the station, as part of the Midland Metro line. The only signs of the original building are the station toilets, whose doorways are blocked up, on Booth Street.

Image gallery

References

  (for coordinates)

Further reading

External links
Handsworth and Smethwick station on Warwickshire Railways.com

Former Great Western Railway stations
Disused railway stations in Birmingham, West Midlands
Railway stations in Great Britain opened in 1854
Railway stations in Great Britain closed in 1972